Krasnaya Zvezda (Красная звезда; Russian for Red Star) is a Soviet and later Russian military newspaper.

Krasnaya Zvezda may also refer to:
 Krasnaya Zvezda State Enterprise, a Russian state enterprise that research and produce nuclear power systems for spacecraft
 Order of the Red Star, Soviet military decoration
 Red Star (novel), 1908 Russian sci-fi novel about a Martian communist society

See also
 Red star (disambiguation)